Tri Sviatitelia (meaning the Three Holy Hierarchs) was a pre-dreadnought battleship built for the Imperial Russian Navy during the 1890s. She served with the Black Sea Fleet and was flagship of the forces pursuing the mutinous battleship  in June 1905. During World War I the ship encountered the German battlecruiser  (formally Yavuz Sultan Selim) twice, but never hit the German ship, nor was she damaged by her. From 1915 onward she was relegated to the coast bombardment role as she was the oldest battleship in the fleet. Tri Sviatitelia was refitting in Sevastopol when the February Revolution of 1917 began and she was never operational afterwards.

Tri Sviatitelia was captured when the Germans took the city in May 1918 and was turned over to the Allies after the Armistice in November 1918. Her engines were destroyed in 1919 by the British when they withdrew from Sevastopol to prevent the advancing Bolsheviks from using her against the White Russians. She was abandoned when the Whites evacuated the Crimea in 1920 and was scrapped in 1923.

Design

Tri Sviatitelias design was based on an enlarged version of the Baltic Fleet battleship  with some improvements in armour and armament. Tri Sviatitelia was considerably larger than Navarin, being  longer,  wider and displacing  more.

Propulsion
Tri Sviatitelia had three dynamos with a total output of 305 kW, but these were too small and could not supply enough power to work all the electrical equipment simultaneously.

Armament
Her main armament consisted of four 40-calibre  Obukhov Model 1895 guns mounted in hydraulically powered twin-gun turrets fore and aft. Each turret had a firing arc of 270°. The guns had a firing interval of 105 seconds between rounds. They had a maximum elevation of +15 degrees and could depress to −5 degrees.

All eight 45-caliber  Canet Pattern 1892 guns were mounted in casemates on the upper deck. The guns could elevate to a maximum of 20 degrees and depress to −5 degrees. They had a maximum range of  when fired at maximum elevation.

The anti-torpedo boat armament consisted of a large number of different guns. Four 45-calibre  Canet Pattern 1892 guns were mounted at the corners of the superstructure. The rate of fire was between twelve and fifteen rounds per minute. A total of 10  Hotchkiss guns were carried: six between the 4.7-inch guns, two at the forward end of the superstructure and two in embrasures in the aft hull. A total of 40  Hotchkiss guns were mounted; eight in each of the fighting tops, eight on top of the superstructure, twelve in small hull embrasures fore and aft and the locations of the remaining four are uncertain.

Tri Sviatitelia carried six  torpedo tubes. The forward broadside tubes were underwater, but the other four tubes were above water, one each in the bow and stern and the aft pair of broadside tubes. The Type L torpedo carried a  warhead of TNT.

Protection
Tri Sviatitelia was the first Russian ship to use Harvey armour. The armour was made by Vickers in Britain as well as the French firms of Schneider et Cie and Saint Chamond. This was the thickest armour ever carried by a Russian battleship. It covered  of the ship's length. The upper  of the belt was intended to be above the waterline, but the ship was overweight and much of the belt was submerged. The belt terminated in  transverse bulkheads.

It had 16-inch sides and was closed off by 16-inch transverse bulkheads fore and aft.

Major refit in 1911–12
Tri Sviatitelia was reconstructed between November 1911 and August 1912. A number of different proposals had been considered earlier, including one to replace all of her obsolete Harvey armour with modern Krupp armour and others to replace her main guns or turrets, but these were rejected as too expensive. Her masts and fighting tops were replaced by pole masts and all of her light guns and torpedo tubes were removed with the exception of two 47-millimetre guns retained for use as saluting guns. Her 4.7-inch guns were replaced by four shielded 6-inch guns on the roof of the upper casemate. The upper casemate was modified to accommodate two extra 6-inch guns and her superstructure was reduced in size. The maximum elevation of her main guns was increased to 25° and their breeches and loading mechanisms were upgraded to increase their rate of fire to one round every 40 seconds.

Service
Tri Sviatitelia was named after the Three Holy Hierarchs of the Eastern Orthodox Church. She was built by Nikolayev Dockyard and laid down 15 August 1891, although actual construction had begun about January 1891. The ship was launched 12 November 1893 and transferred to Sevastopol for completion the following year. Officially she entered service in 1895 with the Black Sea Fleet, but her sea trials did not begin until September–October 1896. The ship was flagship of Rear Admiral F. F. Vishnevetskii during the failed attempt to recapture the mutinous battleship  on 30 June 1905. Her forward fighting top was removed about 1908.

World War I
Tri Sviatitelia, accompanied by the pre-dreadnoughts  (flagship),  (the former Potemkin), bombarded Trebizond on the morning of 17 November 1914 and was intercepted by the Ottoman battlecruiser Yavuz Sultan Selim and the light cruiser Midilli the following day on their return voyage to Sevastopol in what came to be known as the Battle of Cape Sarych. Despite the noon hour the conditions were foggy and the capital ships initially did not spot each other. The Black Sea Fleet had experimented on concentrating fire from several ships under the control of a "master ship" before the war and Evstafi held her fire until Ioann Zlatoust, the master ship, could see Yavuz. However the Tri Sviatitelia used Ioann Zlatousts inaccurate range data and failed to register any hits on the Ottoman ship.

Tri Sviatitelia and Rostislav bombarded Ottoman fortifications at the mouth of the Bosphorus on 18 March 1915, but only fired 105 rounds before sailing north to rejoin the covering force. Tri Sviatitelia and Rostislav were to have repeated the bombardment the following day, but heavy fog prevented the operation. On 3 April, Yavuz and several ships of the Turkish navy raided the Russian port at Odessa; the Russian battleship squadron sortied to intercept them. The battleships chased Yavuz the entire day, but were unable to reach effective gunnery range and were forced to break off the chase. On 25 April Tri Sviatitelia and Rostislav repeated their bombardment of the Bosporus forts. Sviatitelia, Rostislav and Panteleimon bombarded the forts again on 2 and 3 May. However, this time a total of 337 main gun rounds were fired in addition to a total of 528 six-inch shells between the three battleships.

On 9 May 1915, Tri Sviatitelia and Panteleimon returned to bombard the Bosphorus forts, covered by the remaining pre-dreadnoughts. Yavuz intercepted the three ships of the covering force, although no damage was inflicted by either side. Tri Sviatitelia and Pantelimon rejoined their consorts and the latter scored two hits on Yavuz before she broke off the action. The Russian ships pursued her for six hours before giving up the chase. Tri Sviatitelia was fitted with a pair of  anti-aircraft guns
on top of each of her turrets during 1915 and screens were added on top of her funnels to keep out light bombs. On 12 August 1915 she, and all the other pre-dreadnoughts, were transferred to the 2nd Battleship Brigade, after the dreadnought  had entered service. During 1916 she conducted coast bombardment and anti-shipping missions off the Anatolian coast.

Tri Sviatitelia was refitting in Sevastopol during the February Revolution of 1917. Immobile, she was captured by the Germans in Sevastopol in May 1918 and handed over to the Allies in December 1918 after the Armistice. The British wrecked her engines on 24 April 1919 when they left the Crimea to prevent the advancing Bolsheviks from using her against the White Russians. The ship was captured by both sides during the Russian Civil War, but was abandoned by the White Russians when they evacuated the Crimea in November 1920. Tri Sviatitelia was scrapped in 1923, although she was not stricken from the Navy List until 21 November 1925.

Notes

Footnotes

Bibliography

External links
 
 Page in Russian language
 Page in English
 page in English from Black Sea Fleet

World War I battleships of Russia
Battleships of Russia
1893 ships
Battleships of the Imperial Russian Navy